The list of ship decommissionings in 1942 includes a chronological list of all ships decommissioned in 1942.


See also 

1942
 Ship decommissionings
Ship